Rampal is an upazila of Bagerhat District in the Division of Khulna, Bangladesh.

Geography
It has 33119 households and total area 335.46 km2.

Demographics
As of the 1991 Bangladesh census, Rampal has a population of 167070. Males constitute 50.83% of the population, and females 49.17%. This upazila's eighteen up population is 93518. Rampal has an average literacy rate of 45.5% (7+ years), and the national average of 32.4% literate.

Administration
Rampal Upazila is divided into ten union parishads: Baintala, Banshtali, Bhojpatia, Gaurambha, Hurka, Mallikerber, Perikhali, Rajnagar, Rampal, and Ujalkur. The union parishads are subdivided into 117 mauzas and 135 villages.

See also
Upazilas of Bangladesh
Districts of Bangladesh
Divisions of Bangladesh

References

 
Upazilas of Bagerhat District